is a 1986 Japanese action comedy science fiction anime film that had several sequels and a spin-off. This film focuses on a happy-go-lucky 16-year-old red-haired, sailor-suited teenage schoolgirl, A-ko Magami, who goes on her magical adventure from high school to outer space as she struggles to finish her homework, rescue her friend C-ko, and save the Earth from an evil alien invasion. This series references a number of other works of anime from the 1970s and 1980s, such as Macross, Fist of the North Star and Gundam.

Plot
An alien space craft crashes into Graviton City, wiping out the entire population and leaving a massive crater where the city is rebuilt. Students A-ko Magami, a perky, fun-loving red-haired, sailor-suited teenage girl, and her best friend C-ko Kotobuki, a bubbly, carefree optimist, enter a new year of school as transfer students at the all-girls Graviton High School. Although A-ko possesses superhuman speed and strength, she considers herself an average teenager. She mostly worries about getting to school on time, due to her habit of chronically oversleeping her alarm clock each morning. The pair catch the unwanted attention of B-ko Daitokuji, a rich, snobbish, spoiled, and brilliant fellow student.

B-ko develops an obsession in regards to C-ko, and is determined to win her over. B-ko's attempts to win C-ko over fail, however, and remembering that she was A-ko's rival back in kindergarten, B-ko creates a series of mecha piloted by her team of female followers to attack A-ko each morning. After losing each new and more powerful mecha, she eventually creates and dons the "Akagiyama 23," a powered suit that looks like a bikini. B-ko quickly escalates the fight across the school with no restraint.

Trench-coated spy "D" has been monitoring A-ko and C-ko each morning and reporting back to a large spacecraft as it approaches Earth. The aliens' conclusion is that they have located a lost princess whom they have been looking for. The aliens finally reach Earth and begin an all-out attack against the Graviton military, which is outmatched by the alien technology. A-ko and B-ko's own fight continues across the big city even as the military and aliens do battle. C-ko is abducted in the middle of this confrontation by "D," who is revealed to be a member of the Lepton Kingdom of Alpha Cygni, an all-female race of aliens. C-ko is their princess.

Witnessing the abduction, A-ko and B-ko set aside their differences. Infiltrating the spaceship, A-ko confronts D and the ship's alcoholic Captain Napolipolita, while B-ko rescues C-ko. B-ko then reneges on the truce and opens fire on A-ko, D, and the Captain, destroying the ship's navigation system. The vessel lands, precariously perched on top of the city's Military Command Tower (actually the remains of the previously crashed ship).

A-ko happily awakens the next morning, sore from the previous day's adventures, and walks with C-ko to school in their new uniforms. The girls pass by a disheveled D and the Captain begging for donations to repair their ship. The film ends with B-ko, ready for yet another fight, smiling as A-ko appears on the horizon.

Cast

Production and release
The film was directed by Katsuhiko Nishijima who would later go on to direct Agent Aika and Labyrinth of Flames. Production of the film included several artists who would later create other popular works, including Kia Asamiya and Atsuko Nakajima. Also noted is the western source of the soundtrack, credited to Joey Carbone and Richie Zito.

The title itself is a reference to the 1983 Jackie Chan movie Project A, although the film bears no resemblance to Project A; the working title ended up sticking.

In Japanese, "-ko" is a common suffix for girls' names, like Hanako, Rumiko, and Yuriko, or indeed Eiko, which sounds just like A-ko. The literal meaning is "child", so A-ko is a generic "Child A", a common way to reference peripheral characters in Japanese contemporary drama. In the making-of documentary for the film, it is stated that "A-ko", "B-ko", and "C-ko" were intended as generic "Jane Doe"-type names.

Project A-ko was initially planned to be part of the Cream Lemon series of pornographic OVAs, but during the production of the series, it was decided to make it into a more mainstream title. The only sequence animated during its Cream Lemon days left in the revised production is B-ko's private bath scene. In a nod to Project A-ko's origins as a Cream Lemon episode, the owner and several working girls from the brothel in the Cream Lemon episode "Pop Chaser" - where director Katsuhiko Nishijima was one of the animators - can be seen in one of the classrooms A-ko and B-ko crash through during a fight sequence in the film.

Nishijima states (possibly in jest) that he took on this project because he was missing some teeth at the time and needed the funding from this film to buy new ones.

Release
The film was released to theaters by Shochiku-Fuji on June 21, 1986, alongside a shorter film titled Going on a Journey: Ami Final Chapter. Pony Video distributed the film via VHS and LaserDisc later in the year.

Project A-Ko was Central Park Media's first video release in 1991 alongside Dominion Tank Police and MD Geist. They later released a dubbed version produced by Manga Entertainment to VHS in 1992. The English dub for the rest of the franchise was produced with Ocean Studios instead.

After releasing Project A-ko on DVD in its original widescreen video format, Central Park Media later released a "Collector's Series" version in 2002, which features remastered video and coloring, a large number of A-ko related extras, commentary and interviews by many of the Project A-ko staff, and a free Project A-ko soundtrack CD.

On May 17, 2011, Eastern Star released a newly remastered R1 Project A-ko DVD. It contains many of the extras of the original CPM release, minus the soundtrack CD. In September 2020, it was announced Discotek Media will release the film on Blu-ray. The footage for the film was to be sourced from the laserdisc release using the Domesday Duplicator to capture the footage at a higher quality than previous releases, with a technology called AstroRes being used to upscale the footage and restore it to a higher quality. In March 2021, Discotek announced that the film will instead be sourced from the original 35mm film negatives, which were previously thought lost. The 35mm film negatives had been stored in a film laboratory but a clerical error had resulted in confusion as to where it was.

Critical reception 
The film has largely been praised reviewers who consider it a classic for fans of Japanese anime. The film's humor was praised, with Hyper magazine saying the film "had me in stitches with its fast hitting cheesy humour."

Reviewer Joe Bob Briggs praised the film, citing the more adult subject matter compared to Saturday morning cartoons and crazy action, giving it four out of four stars. He placed the film alongside others such as Gunbuster and Dominion: Tank Police which feature scantily clad women in science fiction adventures causing a lot of mayhem.

GameFan writer Shidoshi considers the film a "must see" film for any serious anime fan, saying it rises above being a mere parody and stands on its own as a work. He also says that it is the best film in the series, with the sequels being the sort of work that the film set out to mock.

However, some reviewers found the story confusing and hard to follow, with GameZone magazine saying "Confused? You better believe it. The plot's got more twists than a bag of noodles".

Sequels

Central Park Media has released the three theatrical sequels (often erroneously cited in U.S. anime references as OVAs) in a single-disc DVD collection, 'Project A-ko: Love and Robots':

 Plot of the Daitokuji Financial Group (1987)
 Cinderella Rhapsody (1988)
 FINAL (1989)

After this original series, a spin-off entitled A-ko the Vs (1990) was created and released in the OVA format. In this two-part series (a "Grey side" and "Blue side"), A-ko and B-ko are partners hunting monsters in an extraterrestrial environment, with no relationship to the previous series. Central Park Media released it as Project A-ko: Uncivil Wars.

References

External links

 
 
 

 
1986 anime films
1980s Japanese films
1980s Japanese-language films
1980s parody films
1980s rediscovered films
1980s science fiction comedy films
Animated films set in the future
Discotek Media
Japanese animated science fiction films
Japanese science fiction comedy films
Central Park Media
CPM Press
Films about impact events
Shochiku films